Fillemon Shuumbwa Nangolo (born 4 June 1974 in Enkono, Ondonga) is the reigning king of Ondonga kingdom, a sub-tribe of Owambo people since 2019 in Namibia. Nangolo is the nephew of late King Immanuel Kauluma Elifas who reigned from 1975 - 2019. The Ondonga tribal area is situated around Namutoni on the eastern edge of Etosha pan in northern Namibia. On 14 April, he was appointed the king of the Aandonga. His uncle Konisa Kalenga was also being crowned as king the same day. The succession dispute ended with Shuumbwa being recognised by Government in June 2019.

Early life and education
In June 2002, the King Elifas appointed Nangolo as his assistant and successor. King Elifas died in March 2019.

Nangolo attended primary school at Okashandja and Olukonda before matriculating at Oshakati Senior Secondary School, he received basic military training at the Osona military base near Okahandja in 1999 and become a member of the then Namibian Defence Force (NDF) air wing unit were he is currently  a  Wing Commander. In the year 2000 and 2001 he received aircraft instrument, mechanical and pilot-related training from the Denel Technical Academy in Gauteng, South Africa and participated in Operation Atlantic  Second Congo War (DRC). Nangolo has also received training in common and customary law and also served on the Law Reform and Development Commission (LRDC), then chaired by the justice minister Sacky Shanghala.

King Shuumbwa was officially installed as the 18th legitimate king of the Ondonga on 29 June 2019 at Onambango palace, a historical event that attracted thousands of people including Namibian vice president Nangolo Mbumba a nephew to Shuumbwa and other government ministers and senior officials. He was officially sworn in by the chairman of the Oukwanyama Traditional Authority, senior traditional councillor George Nelulu, on behalf of the Queen of Oukwanyama, Martha Mwadinomo Nelumbu a day after a second High Court bid by a faction supporting Konis Eino Kalenga for the kingship failed.

Personal life
Nangolo married Adelheid Gustaf at Oniihwa, Onayena on 7 April 2007 and established their homestead at Onambango near Ondangwa, which is now the Ondonga palace.

See also
List of Ondonga kings
Ndonga dialect
Ovambo language

References

External links
 "Namibia Traditional Polities" at World Statesmen.org

1978 births
History of Namibia
Namibian chiefs
Ovambo people
Namibian military personnel
People from Oshikoto Region
21st-century monarchs in Africa
Ondonga royalty
Living people